is a Shinto shrine in the Ichinomiya neighborhood of the city of Tama in Tokyo Metropolis, Japan. It is one of the two shrines claiming the title of ichinomiya of former Musashi Province. The main festival of the shrine is held annually on the second Sunday of September.

Enshrined kami
The kami enshrined at Ono Jinja are:
 , ancestor of the Chichibu Kuni no miyatsuko

History
The origins of Ono Jinja are unknown. The site of the provincial capital of Musashi Province are located nearby, and the shrine first appears in the historical record in 772, followed by a mention in the Nihon Sandai Jitsuroku in 884, and in the Engishiki, where it is listed as a minor shrine. It is styled as the "ichinomiya" of Musashi in the early Kamakura period Azuma Kagami and in the Nanboku-chō period Shintōshū.The shrine was rebuilt in the Sengoku period by the Late Hōjō clan and Ota Dokanand received a stipend in the Edo Period from the Tokugawa shogunate. 

During the Meiji period era of State Shinto, the shrine was rated as a county shrine under the Modern system of ranked Shinto Shrines. 

The shrine is located a six-minute walk from Seiseki-Sakuragaoka Station on the Keio Electric Railway Keio Line.

Gallery

See also
List of Shinto shrines
Ichinomiya

References
 Plutschow, Herbe. Matsuri: The Festivals of Japan. RoutledgeCurzon (1996) 
 Ponsonby-Fane, Richard Arthur Brabazon. (1959).  The Imperial House of Japan. Kyoto: Ponsonby Memorial Society. OCLC 194887

External links

Official homepage

Notes

Shinto shrines in Tokyo
Musashi Province
Tama, Tokyo
Ichinomiya